The Palmerston Forts around Milford Haven include:

Fort Hubberstone
Popton Fort
Scoveston Fort
South Hook Fort
Stack Rock Fort
Thorn Island Fort
Llanion Battery
St Catherine's Fort, Tenby
Chapel Bay Fort
West Blockhouse Fort
Dale Fort
East and West Blockhouses

Forts in Pembrokeshire
History of Pembrokeshire
Military history of Pembrokeshire
Milford Haven